Atlantic Technological University (also known as Atlantic TU or ATU) is a technological university in the west and north-west of Ireland. It was formally established on 1 April 2022 as a merger of three existing institutes of technology (ITs) - Galway-Mayo IT, IT Sligo, and Letterkenny IT - into a single university, the fourth such TU in Ireland.

History

With alliances made in 2012, by 2015, Galway-Mayo IT (GMIT), along with IT Sligo and Letterkenny IT (LYIT), submitted a formal Expression of Interest to the Higher Education Authority (HEA) in the Republic of Ireland for re-designation as a Technological University. This partnership, known as the Connacht-Ulster Alliance (CUA), aimed to establish a 'Technological University' in the West of Ireland and County Donegal, a county in Ulster in the north of Ireland, and was in the planning stage in October 2018.

The plan was a tenet of the GMIT strategic plan 2019 – 2023.

The CUA planned to make a formal application in 2021, with a TU beginning operations in 2022. In October 2020, the constituent IT's were allocated over €5.5 million towards transformation.

Formal approval was granted in October 2021 by Simon Harris, Minister for Further and Higher Education, Research, Innovation and Science, with a launch date in April 2022. LYIT is the only part of the technological university located in Ulster, the northern province in Ireland.

Campuses

Galway Campus
Atlantic TU Galway campus is based on the Dublin Road in Galway city, overlooking Galway Bay. It is the administrative headquarters for the Institute and has four Schools of study; the School of Business, the School of Engineering, the School of Science & Computing, and Galway International Hotel School.

Also located at this campus are the Innovation Hub, the Lifelong Learning Centre and the Research, Development & Innovation Centre.

Sligo Campus
Based in Ash Lane, Sligo town.

Centre for Creative Arts and Media (CCAM)
GMIT's Centre for Creative Arts and Media (CCAM) is located a mile from the main campus on the Monivea Road.  It is based in an old Redemptorist Monastery and is now the location of an Art, Design and Media college.

It offers undergraduate courses in design, contemporary arts, film & documentary, textiles and fine art.  In 2016, it introduced post-graduate courses in Creative Practice to support artists, designers and filmmakers.

The annual graduate exhibitions and screenings showcase the work being produced throughout the academic year.

Letterkenny Campus
ATU Letterkenny Campus lies on the N14 national road.

Killybegs Campus
The ATU Killybegs Campus houses the School of Tourism. It is located by the harbour.

Mayo Campus

Atlantic TU Mayo campus is located at Castlebar on approximately 20 hectares of land.

Degree courses on offer include business, engineering, humanities, nursing and social care, and technology.  GMIT Mayo campus also offers a wide range of Lifelong Learning courses, and has an Innovation Hub to support entrepreneurs and start-up businesses.

Letterfrack Campus

Atlantic TU Letterfrack campus is the National Centre of Excellence for Furniture Design and Wood Technology, and has been involved with the study of furniture design since 1987.

It offers degree courses in furniture design and manufacture, furniture and wood technology, and teacher education (construction studies and DCG).  
The campus is located in Connemara in County Galway.

Mountbellew Campus

Mountbellew was the first agricultural college in Ireland, set up by the Franciscan Brothers in 1904.  The original college was demolished in 1971 and replaced with the new building in 1975. In 1986, the Franciscan Brothers Agricultural College established a link with (the then) Regional Technical College, Galway to deliver a Higher Certificate in Business Studies (Agribusiness).

Today, ATU students in Mountbellew can choose between three types of degree (Agri-Business, Agri-Science or Agri-Engineering) and spend time between the Mountbellew and Galway Campuses.

See also
 Education in the Republic of Ireland

References

External links
 

 

Castlebar
Education in County Galway
Education in County Mayo
Institutes of technology in the Republic of Ireland
Buildings and structures in Letterkenny
Education in Letterkenny
Art schools in Ireland
Sligo (town)
Educational institutions established in 1970
Educational institutions established in 2022
Education in County Sligo
Technological universities in the Republic of Ireland
Universities established in the 2020s
2022 establishments in Ireland